Chupi Chupi (English: Silently) is a 2013 film directed by Abir Bose and produced by Rakesh Shrivastav under the banner of Ma Sarada Chitra Mandir 2012 Production. It features actors Ritojit and Priyanka Haldar in the lead roles. This film is Abir Bose's third film, his last release being long back in 1988 (Kidnap). It released on 26 April 2013.

Plot
The film is a love story based on the Ghoti-Bangal theme. It is a romantic drama where a couple from Siliguri, namely Gourab and Jini, fall in love and dream of spending their life together. But when it comes to convincing their concerned families, a weird thing happens. Involving Bangal-Ghoti feud, their life becomes unmanageable and miserable. Both the families send off them to Kolkata, but at different places to try to break their relationship. While moving to Kolkata, Jini prepares herself and apparently gets a job at a private concern. After this, the story has its twists.

Cast

Main cast
Hritojeet Chottopadhay as Gourab
 Priyanka Haldar as Jini

Supporting cast
 Laboni Sarkar
 Koushik Bandyopadhyay
 Kharaj Mukherjee
 Manasi Sinha
 Subhasish Banerjee
 Rashmi Jha
 Satabdi Pal
 Tanmay Chanda
 Bijit Basu
 Mrinmoy Chaudhury

Soundtrack

The soundtrack of Chupi Chupi was composed by Goutam Ganguly. The lyrics were penned by Goutam Susmit, Goutam Ganguly and director Abir Bose.

Track listing

References

Bengali-language Indian films
2010s Bengali-language films